General Hendrik Johan Kruls (1 August 1902 – 13 December 1975) was a Dutch military officer who served as highest-ranking member of the Dutch Armed Forces between 1945 and 1951. First as Commander-in-chief of the Armed forces between 1945 and 1949. And served, after the renaming of the position, as Chairman of the United Defence Staff of the Armed Forces of the Netherlands between 1949 and 1951.

References

External links 
 

1902 births
1975 deaths
Royal Netherlands Army generals
Royal Netherlands Army officers
Chiefs of the Defence Staff (Netherlands)